Meiyuan Kaiyuan Temple Station, is the western terminus of Line 2, Wuxi Metro. It started operations on 28 December 2014. The station is near The Plum Garden.

Station Layout

Exits
There are 9 exits for this station.

References

Railway stations in Jiangsu
Wuxi Metro stations
Railway stations in China opened in 2014